The 7 Most Endangered Programme identifies endangered monuments and sites in Europe and mobilizes public and private partners on a local, national and European level to find a viable future for those sites.

It was launched by Europa Nostra and the European Investment Bank Institute in January 2013.

The 7 Most Endangered Programme is inspired by a successful programme of the US National Trust for Historic Preservation, based in Washington. It does not provide funding. Its aim is to serve as a catalyst for action and raise awareness.

Entries can be submitted by Europa Nostra’s country representations, member and associate organisations as well as by established public and private bodies active in the heritage field located in countries where Europa Nostra is not yet represented.

An international advisory panel, comprising specialists in history, archaeology, architecture, conservation and finance, meet to discuss over the applications and shortlist the most endangered monuments and sites. The board of Europa Nostra reviews the list which is then publicly announced during an annual congress.

Rescue missions to the sites included in the final list are then organised and the sites are visited. The results and recommendations of the rescue missions are summarised in reports that become available on the organisation's website.

The list

References

Cultural heritage of Europe
Historic preservation
7 Most Endangered Programme